Door Wide Open: A Beat Love Affair In Letters, 1957-1958 is a collection of letters that were written in 1957-1958 between Joyce Johnson and Jack Kerouac.

The letters depict the rather detached and absurd romance of the two writers, and they are supplemented greatly by Johnson's own narration and related letters between Joyce and her friends and relatives. Johnson is referred to in Kerouac's novel Desolation Angels as Alyce Newman, and she has written several introductions for his works.

The relationship between the two took place during a very pivotal time period in Kerouac's life, when his fame was exploding after the release of On the Road.

Door Wide Open spans events from the couple's first meeting until after the romance had faded into friendship.

Books about the Beat Generation
Jack Kerouac
Viking Press books
2002 non-fiction books
Collections of letters